Stephen R. Fitzgarrald (December 25, 1854 – June 2, 1926) was the 17th Lieutenant Governor of Colorado, serving from 1909 to 1915 serving under Governors John F. Shafroth and Elias M. Ammons. Fitzgarrald was a Democrat.

Early life

Stephan and his father George Fitzgarrald came to Colorado prospecting in 1878. During a brief period of mining in Leadville he developed an interest in law.  Shortly after he returned to Iowa to study law.

Political career

In 1881,  he settled permanently in Colorado. First living in Ophir, he moved to Telluride in 1883. On March 22, 1885, Stephan married Letha L. McConnell.  In 1915, he moved again to the Silverton-Ouray district and later to Denver.  Served as City, County, and Deputy District Attorney.  Stephan was a member of the Colorado House of Representatives between the years of 1893 and 1895.

Stephen sponsored legislation of benefit to people of Colorado, dealing with deed of trust sales, attachment suits, and excessive tax penalties.

Notes 

Lieutenant Governors of Colorado
Colorado Democrats
1854 births
1926 deaths
People from San Miguel County, Colorado
People from Telluride, Colorado